The Town of Raymer is a Statutory Town located in Weld County, Colorado, United States.  The population was 96 at the U.S. Census 2010.

The community has two official names:
Raymer - The legal name of the incorporated Town of Raymer.
New Raymer - The official United States Postal Service designation.

Raymer hosts a Minuteman Missile launch site from Warren Air Force Base.

History
The Chicago, Burlington and Quincy Railroad platted the Raymer townsite in Weld County in 1888. The town was named for George Raymer, an assistant chief engineer for the railroad. The Raymer Post Office opened on June 27, 1888. The town flourished for a while, but families eventually moved away and the Post Office closed on May 14, 1895.

The town was given a second life when it was replatted in 1909. On November 13, 1909, the United States Post Office Department open a new post office named New Raymer to distinguish it from the old Raymer post office. The town was incorporated in 1919 under its original name as the Town of Raymer.

The State of Colorado uses the name Raymer for the town, but the United States Postal Service uses the name New Raymer (ZIP code 80742) and refuses to accept the name Raymer for postal delivery. Either name may appear on maps or in gazetteers.

Geography

Raymer (New Raymer) is located at  (40.608649, -103.842963).

Climate

According to the Köppen Climate Classification system, Raymer has a cold semi-arid climate, abbreviated "BSk" on climate maps.

Demographics

At the U.S. Census 2000, there were 91 people, 37 households, and 26 families residing in the town. The racial makeup of the town was 98.90% White, 1.10% from other races. Hispanic or Latino of any race were 7.69% of the population.

There were 37 households, out of which 27.0% had children under the age of 18 living with them, 54.1% were married couples living together, 10.8% had a female householder with no husband present, and 29.7% were non-families. 24.3% of all households were made up of individuals, and 5.4% had someone living alone who was 65 years of age or older. The average household size was 2.46 and the average family size was 2.92.

In the town, the population was spread out, with 28.6% under the age of 18, 7.7% from 18 to 24, 20.9% from 25 to 44, 24.2% from 45 to 64, and 18.7% who were 65 years of age or older. The median age was 38 years. For every 100 females, there were 116.7 males. For every 100 females age 18 and over, there were 103.1 males.

The median income for a household in the town was $26,250, and the median income for a family was $36,875. Males had a median income of $29,583 versus $21,875 for females. The per capita income for the town was $8,470. There were 14.8% of families and 18.8% of the population living below the poverty line, including 11.6% of under eighteens and 40.0% of those over 64.

See also

Outline of Colorado
Index of Colorado-related articles
State of Colorado
Colorado cities and towns
Colorado municipalities
Colorado counties
Weld County, Colorado
Colorado metropolitan areas
Front Range Urban Corridor
North Central Colorado Urban Area
Denver-Aurora-Boulder, CO Combined Statistical Area
Greeley, CO Metropolitan Statistical Area

References

External links
CDOT map of the Town of Raymer

Towns in Weld County, Colorado
Towns in Colorado